The Monastery of San Lourenzo de Carboeiro is one of the most outstanding architectural works of the late Romanesque, the transition to the Gothic,  in Galicia.

It is a Benedictine monastery founded in the 10th century. Its moments of greatest splendor were between 11th and 13th centuries. The church and some other buildings are still in good condition, after the works of restoration and recovery made during the second half of the twentieth century.

Gallery

See also 
 Moreruela Abbey

Bibliography

External links 

 O Mosteiro de Carboeiro 
 Carboeiro Monastery Costa Sur
 Página con historia y fotos antes y después de la restauración 
 El Monasterio de Carboeiro 

Benedictine monasteries in Spain
Monasteries in Galicia (Spain)
Province of Pontevedra
Bien de Interés Cultural landmarks in the Province of Pontevedra